Forever Charlie is the seventh studio album by American R&B singer-songwriter Charlie Wilson. It was released on January 27, 2015, by RCA Records. The album was supported by two singles: "Goodnight Kisses" and "Touched by an Angel". The album includes collaborations with Snoop Dogg and Shaggy. The album was nominated in the category Best R&B album at the 58th Annual Grammy Awards.

Commercial performance
The album debuted at number 17 on the Billboard 200, selling 25,000 copies.

Track listing

"Unforgettable" contains a portion of the composition "Waiting in Vain" written by Bob Marley.
"Sugar.Honey.Ice.Tea" contains a portion of the composition "She's a Bad Mama Jama" written by Otha Leon Haywood.

Charts

Weekly charts

Year-end charts

Release history

References

External links
 
 Forever Charlie at Discogs
 Official website
 My Space Page
 Charlie Wilson in-depth interview by Pete Lewis, 'Blues & Soul' August 2011

Charlie Wilson (singer) albums
2015 albums
RCA Records albums
Albums produced by Jimmy Jam and Terry Lewis